Rivalba is a comune (municipality) in the Metropolitan City of Turin in the Italian region Piedmont, about  northeast of Turin.

Rivalba borders the following municipalities: Castagneto Po, San Raffaele Cimena, Gassino Torinese, Casalborgone, Sciolze, and Cinzano.

Twin towns
 Els Hostalets de Pierola, Spain

References

Cities and towns in Piedmont